Cristian Dumitru Popescu is a Romanian-American mathematician at the University of California, San Diego. His research interests are in algebraic number theory, and in particular, in special values of L-functions.

Education and career
Popescu obtained his Ph.D. from the Ohio State University in  1996, under the direction of Karl Rubin.  He became a professor at Johns Hopkins University, after which he moved to his current position as a professor at UC San Diego.

Research contributions
Popescu formulated and proved function field versions of the Gras conjectures and Rubin's integral refinement of the abelian Stark conjectures.  He has also made important contributions to the Stark conjectures over number fields, formulating an alternative to Rubin's refinement, known as Popescu's conjecture.  Although slightly weaker than Rubin's conjecture, it has the advantage that it can presently be shown to remain true under raising the base field or lowering the top field of the extension.  Popescu and Cornelius Greither formulated equivariant versions of Iwasawa's main conjecture over function fields and number fields, proving unconditionally the function field version and conditionally the number field version.  These conjectures have important implications for the Brumer–Stark conjecture, the Coates-Sinnott conjecture and Gross' conjecture on special values of L-functions.

Recognition
Popescu was elected to the 2021 class of fellows of the American Mathematical Society "for contributions to number theory and arithmetic geometry". Popescu was a 2015-2016 Simons Fellow at Harvard University. He was awarded the Simion Stoilow Prize by the Romanian Academy of Science in 2003. He is an honorary member of the Simion Stoilow Institute of Mathematics of the Romanian Academy of Science.

References

External links 
 Home page

Year of birth missing (living people)
Living people
20th-century Romanian mathematicians
20th-century American mathematicians
University of California, San Diego faculty
Romanian emigrants to the United States
21st-century American mathematicians
Number theorists
Ohio State University alumni
Johns Hopkins University faculty
21st-century Romanian mathematicians
Fellows of the American Mathematical Society